Julio César Brero (also spelled Giulio Cesare; 20 December 1908 Milan – 8 December 1973 Milan) was an Italian-born Argentine composer, music educator, and lawyer.

Education 
He earned his law degree from University of Milan in 1932.  In 1935, he earned a piano teaching diploma from the Philharmonic Academy of Bologna and a diploma in composition from École Normale de Musique de Paris.

Career 
He was professor of choral singing at the Bossi Academy of Music, Milan.  Brero lived fifteen years in Argentina (beginning in the 1940s), where he became prolific in the field of music, in particular, as a teacher of harmony and counterpoint at the National Conservatory of Buenos Aires.

Selected works 
 "Lyrics", for piano and voice / and for piano and orchestra (1933)
 "Concerto for String Orchestra" (1933); 
 "Suite", for cello (1935)
 "Lyrics", for voice and piano (1936)
 "Melodies", for voice and piano (1946)
 "Toccata", for piano (1945)
 "Concertino", for cello and small orchestra (1947)
 "38 Songs of Italian folklore", for voice and piano (1949); 
 "Trio" (1949)
 "Divertimento" in B♭ for flute, clarinet and bassoon (1955); 
 "Variaciones sobre un tema italiano" (1955), dedicated to cellist Adolfo Odnoposoff; 
 "7 Preludes," for piano (1954);

Opera 
 Novella (1953);

Filmography 
 Camino del infierno (1946), composer

Awards 
 1935 — Paris: Prix International de la "Revue Musicale," for "Trio for wind instrument"
 1949 — Buenos Aires: Carlos López Buchardo Award by the Wagnerian Association of Buenos Aires for "String Quartet No. 2

References 

1908 births
1973 deaths
Argentine composers
20th-century composers
Italian emigrants to Argentina